Armee-Abteilung Scholtz / Armee-Abteilung D (Army Detachment D) was an army level command of the German Army in World War I.  It served on the Eastern Front throughout its existence.

History
Armee-Abteilung D was formed on 18 September 1915 from the southern wing of the Army of the Niemen as Armee-Gruppe Scholtz, named for the commander of XX Corps, a headquarters that it absorbed.  On 28 October 1915 it was redesignated Armee-Abteilung Scholtz.  It was established on 10 January 1917 as Armee-Abteilung D.  It was dissolved on 2 October 1918 as a new XX Corps was created.

Commanders
Armee-Abteilung D had the following commanders during its existence:

Glossary
Armee-Abteilung or Army Detachment in the sense of "something detached from an Army".  It is not under the command of an Army so is in itself a small Army.
Armee-Gruppe or Army Group in the sense of a group within an Army and under its command, generally formed as a temporary measure for a specific task.
Heeresgruppe or Army Group in the sense of a number of armies under a single commander.

See also 

XX Corps

References

Bibliography 
 

D
Military units and formations of Germany in World War I
Military units and formations established in 1915
Military units and formations disestablished in 1918